Besós power station is a combined cycle thermoelectric plant located in Sant Adrià de Besòs, suburb of Barcelona, Spain. It consists of two 400 MW thermal units fueled with natural gas, was connected to the grid in 2002 and is owned 50% of Gas Natural and Endesa.

See also 
 List of power stations in Spain
 Barcelona power station
 Besós V power station

References 

Buildings and structures in Barcelona
Power stations in Catalonia
Natural gas-fired power stations in Spain